Aruna Tanwar is an Indian Para Taekwondo Athlete. She is currently World Rank 4th in the W-49 kg | K43 | and World Rank 30th in the W-49 kg | K44 event category of World Para Taekwondo Events.

Career
Aruna was born in Dinod village near Bhiwani in Haryana. Aruna began practising Taekwondo at the tender age eight and currently she is five time National champion and B. PEd. student of Chandigarh University.

2020 Summer Paralympics
Aruna becomes First-ever Indian Taekwondo Athlete To Qualify For Paralympics Olympic Games at Tokyo, Japan on the allocation of a bi-partite invitation spots, where Taekwondo Paralympic event will be featured for the first time for the upcoming Paralympic Games and now she will represent India Team at the Taekwondo Paralympic of the 2020 Summer Paralympics in Tokyo, Japan.

Tournaments Record

References

Coach 
 Swaraj Kumar Singh

Living people
Year of birth missing (living people)
Place of birth missing (living people)
Indian female taekwondo practitioners
Paralympic taekwondo practitioners of India
Sportswomen from Haryana